Clayton Charles Stuart Hill of South Porcupine, Ontario is a Canadian drummer best known for being a member of the Canadian rock band Trooper.

Hill joined Trooper September 9, 2006, and has toured with the band ever since. Hill was featured when Trooper performed in the 2010 Olympics Victory Ceremonies in Vancouver, British Columbia on February 21, 2010. Coverage of the event was broadcast in Canada and around the world on networks such as CTV and Much Music.

Hill currently resides in New Westminster, British Columbia, and continues to perform with Trooper.

References

External links 
 

Canadian rock drummers
Canadian male drummers
Living people
Year of birth missing (living people)